5050 or variation, may refer to:

 A.D. 5050, a year in the 6th millennium CE
 5050 BC, a year in the 6th millennium BCE
 5050 (number), a number in the 5000s range
 5050 Doctorwatson, an asteroid in the Asteroid Belt, the 5050th asteroid registered
 Nagoya Municipal Subway 5050 series, an electric multiple unit train type
 Tobu 5050 series, a variant of the Tobu 5000 series electric multiple unit train type
 Tokyu 5050 series, an electric multiple unit train type
 USAir Flight 5050, a 1989 flight that crashed on takeoff from LaGuardia, NYC, NYS, USA

See also

 
 Fifty-Fifty (disambiguation)
 50 (disambiguation)
 5050x2020